Theodore John Cottrell (born June 13, 1947) is an American football coach and former player. He was formerly the defensive coordinator for the Buffalo Bills, New York Jets, Minnesota Vikings, and the San Diego Chargers in the National Football League (NFL). In 2009, he served as head coach for the New York Sentinels of the United Football League (UFL). Ten years later, he was the linebackers coach for the Birmingham Iron of the Alliance of American Football (AAF), and worked as the defensive coordinator for the Houston Roughnecks of the XFL in 2020.

Playing career
Cottrell started at Delaware Valley College from 1965 to 1968.  He was a seventh-round draft pick of the Atlanta Falcons in the 1969 NFL Draft and played linebacker for two seasons. Was the first black linebacker for the Atlanta Falcons  He ended his career with the Canadian Football League's Winnipeg Blue Bombers, where he played for one more year.

Coaching career
Cottrell began his coaching career at Rutgers University, where he worked as an assistant for eight years. In 1981, he got his first NFL coach job when Marv Levy hired him as linebackers coach for the Kansas City Chiefs.

Considered an innovator in the 3–4 defense, Cottrell was an assistant coach for the Buffalo Bills from 1995 to 2000, the last three seasons as defensive coordinator.  From 1998 through 2000, the Bills finished no worse than sixth in the league in total defense.  In 1999, the Bills led the league in total defense.

In 2001, he joined the New York Jets as assistant head coach and defensive coordinator, and operated the 4–3 scheme favored by head coach Herman Edwards.  He stayed for three seasons.

In 2003, Cottrell was a finalist to become the head coach of the San Francisco 49ers.  He ultimately lost the job to Dennis Erickson.

Cottrell then spent two seasons (2004–2005) as defensive coordinator for the Minnesota Vikings.  In 2005, the Vikings finished fifth in the NFL in takeaways and earned a postseason berth, and defeated the Green Bay Packers in a Wild Card contest. Cotrell was let go, along with Head Coach Mike Tice and the rest of his staff. Cottrell then announced his retirement.

In February 2007, he became the defensive coordinator under new Chargers head coach, Norv Turner.  During the regular season, the Chargers led the NFL in takeaways (48), interceptions (30), and passing rating defense (70.0), the first time a Chargers team ever led in any of these categories. In 2008, many fans wanted Cottrell to be terminated. At the midpoint of the season, the team had a record of 3–5 despite having a highly effective offense. Many attributed this poor record to the fact that the Chargers ranked last among NFL teams in defending against the pass. Defenses led by Cottrell had similar problems in New York and Minnesota. At the midpoint of the 2008 season, the San Diego defense, generally considered to have fantastic talent, had gone two entire games without a quarterback sack nor a takeaway.

On October 28, 2008, Cottrell was fired from his position as San Diego's defensive coordinator.

Cottrell was the head coach for the UFL's New York Sentinels in 2009. After one winless season, Cottrell left the organization.

In 2018, Cottrell became the linebackers coach for the Birmingham Iron of the Alliance of American Football. The following year, he was hired by the Houston Roughnecks of the XFL as defensive coordinator. He was named head coach of the Blues of The Spring League on October 15, 2020.

Personal life
Cottrell's son, T. J. Cottrell, played professionally for the Vikings, Chargers and Sentinels, in each case under his father as coach.

Head coaching record

References

1947 births
Living people
American football linebackers
Canadian football linebackers
Atlanta Falcons players
Birmingham Iron coaches
Buffalo Bills coaches
Delaware Valley Aggies football players
Houston Roughnecks coaches
Minnesota Vikings coaches
New York Jets coaches
New York Sentinels coaches
National Football League defensive coordinators
Rutgers Scarlet Knights football coaches
San Diego Chargers coaches
United Football League (2009–2012) head coaches
Winnipeg Blue Bombers players
People from Chester, Pennsylvania
People from Delaware County, Pennsylvania
Players of American football from Pennsylvania
African-American coaches of American football
African-American players of American football
African-American players of Canadian football
The Spring League coaches
21st-century African-American people
20th-century African-American sportspeople